Little Grove is a suburb of Albany, Western Australia.

Little Grove is situated on a peninsula south of Princess Royal Harbour. Directly across the harbour is Albany's central business district. Little Grove borders Torndirrup National Park in the east. 

It has been the location of sporting activities early in the history of Albany, with access by boats from across the harbour. 

Frenchman Bay Road passes through the suburb.

References

Suburbs of Albany, Western Australia